Asiri de Silva (born 10 June 1983) is a Sri Lankan cricketer. He made his Twenty20 debut for Sri Lanka Navy Sports Club in the 2017–18 SLC Twenty20 Tournament on 1 March 2018.

References

External links
 

1983 births
Living people
Sri Lankan cricketers
Sri Lanka Navy Sports Club cricketers
Place of birth missing (living people)